Wayne Hampson (born 23 August 1957) is a former professional tennis player from Australia.

Career
Hampson competed in the main singles draw of the Australian Open three times and Wimbledon twice, without managing to register a win. The closest he got was at the 1982 Australian Open, where he received a first round bye, before a five set loss in the second round to Eric Sherbeck, the last decided in a tiebreak. He had more success in the doubles, making the third round at the 1982 Australian Open (with Broderick Dyke) and the  1983 Wimbledon Championships (with Chris Johnstone).

He was a doubles finalist at the 1982 Melbourne Indoor tournament, the 1982 South Australian Open and the 1984 Lorraine Open, but lost them all. On the singles circuit, Hampson had his best performance in 1980, making a quarter-final appearance in Perth. He had a win over Kim Warwick at the Sydney Outdoor in 1981 and beat John Alexander en route to the round of 16 at Queen's in 1982.

Grand Prix/WCT career finals

Doubles: 3 (0–3)

Challenger titles

Doubles: (2)

References

1957 births
Living people
Australian male tennis players
Tennis people from Queensland